Steven Haugaard (born April 7, 1956) is an American politician and attorney. He has served as a Republican member for the 10th district in the South Dakota House of Representatives since 2015. He was elected Speaker of the House and served in that office from 2019 to 2021.  He had been elected as Speaker pro tempore of the South Dakota House of Representatives and served in that office from 2017 to 2019.

Early life and education
Haugaard graduated the University of South Dakota with a Bachelor of Science and then the University of Puget Sound School of Law for his Juris Doctor.

Political career
Haugaard was elected as a Republican member for the 10th district in the South Dakota House of Representatives in 2014. He was elected Speaker of the House and served in that office from 2019 to 2021.  He had been elected as Speaker pro tempore of the South Dakota House of Representatives and served in that office from 2017 to 2019.

Committee assignments
2021-2022
House Appropriations Committee
Joint Legislative Procedure Committee
House Legislative Procedure Committee

2019-2020
Joint Legislative Procedure Committee, Chair
House Legislative Procedure Committee, Chair
House Government Operations & Audit Committee, Vice Chair
House State Affairs Committee

2017-2018
 Health & Human Services
 Judiciary

2015-2016
 Health & Human Services
 Judiciary

2022 gubernatorial election

On November 17, 2021, Haugaard announced that he was running for Governor of South Dakota, challenging incumbent Kristi Noem in the Republican primary. He accused Noem of being insufficiently conservative on some issues, as well as of being beholden to special interests. Haugaard was defeated by Noem 76.4% to 23.6% on June 7, 2022.

Election history

2020     Haugaard was re-elected with 6,527 votes; Doug Barthel was also re-elected with 6,188 votes and Michelle L. Hentschel received 4,736 votes.
2018     Haugaard was re-elected with 5,017 votes; Doug Barthel was elected with 5,101 votes and Barbara Saxton received 3,094 votes and Dean Kurtz received 3,066 votes.
2016     Haugaard was re-elected with 5,838; Don Haggar was re-elected with 5,484 votes and Paul Vanderline received 3,437 votes and Dean Kurtz received 3,283 votes.
2014     Haugaard was elected with 3,574 votes; Don Haggar was also elected with 3,774 votes and Jo Hausman received 2,402 votes and James Wrigg received 1,769 votes.

References

|-

1956 births
21st-century American politicians
Educators from South Dakota
Living people
People from Madison, South Dakota
Seattle University alumni
Speakers of the South Dakota House of Representatives
Republican Party members of the South Dakota House of Representatives
University of South Dakota alumni